J. Terblanche is a paralympic swimmer from South Africa competing mainly in category S8 events.

Terblanche competed in the 1996 Summer Paralympics in Atlanta winning a gold and bronze medal.  He won the gold in the 200m medley in a new world record time and won the bronze in the 100m butterfly.  He also competed in the 50m freestyle, finishing eleventh overall in the heats and was disqualified in the 100m breaststroke.

References

External links
 

Paralympic swimmers of South Africa
Swimmers at the 1996 Summer Paralympics
Paralympic gold medalists for South Africa
Paralympic bronze medalists for South Africa
South African male swimmers
Living people
Medalists at the 1996 Summer Paralympics
Year of birth missing (living people)
Paralympic medalists in swimming
S8-classified Paralympic swimmers
20th-century South African people
21st-century South African people